USS Raven (MHC-61), an Osprey-class coastal minehunter, was the third ship of the United States Navy to be named for the raven. The contract to build her was awarded to Intermarine USA in Savannah, Georgia on 31 March 1993 and her keel was laid down on 1 April 1995. She was launched on 28 September 1996, and commissioned on 5 September 1998.

She was decommissioned in January 2007 (on a schedule which has all Osprey-class ships fully decommissioned by the end of 2008) and given to the Egyptian Navy pursuant to the Naval Vessels Transfer Act of 2005 (P.L. 109-134).

She was the 11th ship of the 12 Osprey-class coastal mine hunters, which are named for birds of prey. Osprey class are the world's largest mine hunters to be constructed entirely of fiberglass and designed to survive the shock of underwater explosions. Raven'''s primary mission was reconnaissance, classification, and neutralization of all types of moored and bottom mines in littoral areas, harbors and coastal waterways. She is equipped with a high definition, variable-depth sonar, and a remotely operated, robotic submarine (referred to as a Mine Neutralization Vehicle) used to neutralize mines.  As of September 2000, Raven'' had been forward deployed to Manama, Bahrain. The ship was previously homeported in Ingleside, TX.

External links

MaritimeQuest USS Raven MHC-61 Photo Gallery

References 

Ships built in Savannah, Georgia
1996 ships
Osprey-class coastal minehunters
Ships transferred from the United States Navy to the Egyptian Navy